Tenebrae Vision is the only album of Canadian industrial band Cyberaktif, which consisted of cEvin Key and Dwayne R. Goettel of Skinny Puppy and former Skinny Puppy member Bill Leeb of Front Line Assembly. For Cyberaktif, Leeb is credited as Wilhelm Schroeder, the stage name he used while in Skinny Puppy. The album was released in 1991 through Wax Trax! and features Blixa Bargeld of German industrial band Einstürzende Neubauten.

Background
Tenebrae Vision was accompanied by two singles, Nothing Stays and Temper, both of which were released in 1990 and contain different mixes of the title tracks as well as non-album tracks.
The track "Nothing Stays" was voted the sixteenth greatest industrial song of all time by COMA Music Magazine in their feature article 101 Greatest Industrial Songs of All Time. It appeared also in different versions on various compilation albums.

According to cEvin Key, Cyberaktif is reminiscent of tape trading in the industrial music scene which the band members started off with. "Cyberaktif is [...] the experience of discovering the whole electronic genre", said Key, "[it] is exploring the enthusiasm we once had for that genre." Bill Leeb described their work as "rehashing old things", but said, "it was different this time because we were a bit more established." About the collaboration with Blixa Bargeld, Leeb reported that he and Key were fans of Einstürzende Neubauten and Bargeld happened to be in Vancouver just at the right time. With Bargeld being "an icon to us" and having "major attitude back then", Leeb remembered the collaboration being both "stressful" and "fun".

Tenebrae Vision features samples from the films The Unholy, Videodrome, Dune, and Halloween III: Season of the Witch.

Track listing

Personnel
Cyberaktif
 cEvin Key – engineering, mixing, production
 Dwayne R. Goettel – assistant engineering, assistant mixing, sampler, keyboard
 Wilhelm Schroeder – vocals, production

Additional musicians
 Blixa Bargeld – vocals (4), piano (4), production (4)

Technical personnel
 Marc Ramaer – editing
 Brian Gardner – mastering

References

1991 albums
Industrial albums by Canadian artists
Wax Trax! Records albums